Yingtian Fu may refer to:

 Yingtian (Song Dynasty) (应天府), ancient name of Shangqiu in Song Dynasty
 Yingtian (Ming Dynasty) (应天府), ancient name of Nanjing in Ming Dynasty